Curt Becker (August 7, 1905 – February 21, 1987) was a German politician of the Christian Democratic Union (CDU) and former member of the German Bundestag.

Life 
In 1945 he participated in the foundation of the Mönchengladbach CDU and became its deputy local chairman. He was a member of the CDU's state and federal expert committee for economic policy.  From 1957 to 1961, from 11 June 1964 when he succeeded Luise Rehling, until 1965 and from 1969 to 1976 he was a member of the German Bundestag. He represented the constituency of Mönchengladbach in parliament.

Literature

References

1905 births
1987 deaths
Members of the Bundestag for North Rhine-Westphalia
Members of the Bundestag 1972–1976
Members of the Bundestag 1969–1972
Members of the Bundestag 1961–1965
Members of the Bundestag 1957–1961
Members of the Bundestag for the Christian Democratic Union of Germany